Yaw River or Ywa River is a river of Burma, a tributary of the Irrawaddy.

It flows basically south with a slight trend eastward. It flows past the towns of Ledaing, Anauk Kabyu, and Dawtha with its major tributary, the Sada-on River, entering on the right just below Dawtha.

Notes

See also
List of rivers of Burma

Rivers of Myanmar